"Slow Motion" is a song by rapper Juvenile featuring Soulja Slim. It was released as a single on March 1, 2004 and is Juvenile's only number one hit on the U.S. Billboard Hot 100. The song is an original production by Dani Kartel. It held the number-one position on the Billboard Hot 100 for two weeks from August 7, 2004, and was the first number one for both Juvenile and Soulja Slim. It was the seventh song to reach number 1 posthumously for a credited artist since "Mo Money Mo Problems" by The Notorious B.I.G. in 1997, and was also the first number 1 hit for Cash Money Records.

Background and content
Although not planned as a tribute, it came out as one of the more popular posthumous songs because of Soulja Slim's sudden death in November 2003, before the recording process was released (though the beat and lyrics had already been recorded by Soulja).

The "slow motion" of the title is the movement of a woman's body, with the lyrics proclaiming: "Uh, I like it like that / She working that back; I don't know how to act / Slow motion for me, slow motion for me / Slow motion for me; move it slow motion for me".

According to Billboard, the song is about sex.

Music video
In the video, everyone wears black T-shirts with R.I.P. Soulja Slim in white text on the front and back. There are also people holding Thou shall not kill paperboard signs. In the middle of the video there are cameo appearances by the rappers Birdman and Lil Wayne, signalling the end of animosity between Juvenile and Cash Money.

Originally affiliated with the Cash Money roster, as a result of the huge success of the single Juvenile was signed to Atlantic Records shortly after topping the Billboard chart. The song was produced by Cash Money, but with the new deal a complementary contract was also signed allowing Juvenile to bring his newly formed UTP (Up Town Projects) label to Atlantic. The production on the album with the Williams duo was considered a one-time collaboration from then on.

Remixes
"Slow Motion" Official Remix featuring Ying Yang Twins and Wyclef Jean from Juvenile's Greatest Hits compilation.
"Slow Motion Megamix", featuring Wyclef Jean, Juvenile, Soulja Slim, Ying Yang Twins, UTP and Bun B.
"Slow Motion" was sampled by the American recording artist Kesha, in her song of the same title, featuring Three 6 Mafia. Though planned to be on her first album Animal, it was scrapped from the record and remains an unreleased track.
"Kill Tonight" featured on Tyga's Black Thoughts Vol.1
"Slow Motion" Remix featuring August Alsina from his EP "August Alsina University".

Charts and certifications

Weekly charts

Year-end charts

Certifications

Release history

See also
List of Hot 100 number-one singles of 2004 (U.S.)
List of Billboard Rhythmic number-one songs of the 2000s

References 

2004 singles
Juvenile (rapper) songs
Billboard Hot 100 number-one singles
Cash Money Records singles
Songs written by Juvenile (rapper)
2003 songs